Norman Jones (June 4, 1941 – January 18, 2020), known as Bubby Jones, was a driver in the USAC Sprint Car series, with 22 victories, and a member of the National Sprint Car Hall of Fame, inducted in 1998.  He also raced in the USAC Championship Car series, in the 1977–1978 seasons, with 2 career starts, including the 1977 Indianapolis 500.  He failed in qualifying attempts at Indy in 1978 and 1981.

In 1980 "Ol' Bub" headed west to run in the prestigious California Racing Association (C.R.A.) Sprint Car Series as a regular, driving the Gas Chem Products Entry. After finishing 2nd in the C.R.A. Point Standings three years in a row (1980–82) behind Dean Thompson, Jones persuaded car owner Dan Kazarian to change from the Stanton Chassis they had been running, and to let Jones build them a new car himself. The result was Jones winning two consecutive C.R.A. Point Series Championships (1983–84). In 1984, Jones won the coveted Pacific Coast National Open at Ascot, holding off a fast closing Steve Kinser despite blistering the right rear tire with 10 laps to go. Bubby died Saturday night, January 18, 2020, at the age of 78.

Racing record

Complete USAC Mini-Indy Series results

External links
Vale: Norman "Bubby" Jones
Driver Database Profile

1941 births
2020 deaths
Champ Car drivers
Indianapolis 500 drivers
National Sprint Car Hall of Fame inductees
People from Danville, Illinois
Racing drivers from Illinois
USAC Silver Crown Series drivers